Martinus Cornelis Koeman (26 July 1938 – 18 December 2013) was a Dutch footballer who played as a centre-back.

Biography 
Koeman played professional football with KFC of Koog aan de Zaan from 1955 to 1960, Blauw-Wit Amsterdam from 1960 to 1963, GVAV/Groningen from 1963 to 1973 and SC Heerenveen until his retirement. He was selected regularly for the Netherlands national team but only played one match, against Austria on 12 April 1964. Despite his respectable career, he is best known for being the father of Erwin and Ronald Koeman, who followed in their father's footsteps as footballers, with both of his sons playing for Groningen and the Dutch national team. One of the stands in the Euroborg stadium of Groningen has been named Koeman Stand after Martin and his two sons. On 16 June 2021 FC Groningen, Erwin, and Ronald unveiled a statue of Koeman next to the statue of his friend Tonny van Leeuwen on the 50th anniversary of the club. 

On 18 December 2013, at the age 75, Martin Koeman died from heart failure after falling ill a few days earlier.

References

External links

Stats as a player at FC Groningen

1938 births
2013 deaths
People from Purmerend
Association football defenders
Dutch footballers
Netherlands international footballers
FC Groningen players
SC Heerenveen players
FC Groningen managers
Blauw-Wit Amsterdam players
Eredivisie players
Dutch football managers
Footballers from North Holland
Koeman family